Buccinastrum is a genus of sea snails, marine gastropod mollusks in the family Buccinanopsidae, the Nassa mud snails or dog whelks and the like.

Species
 Buccinastrum deforme (P. P. King, 1832)
 Buccinastrum duartei (Klappenbach, 1961)
 Buccinastrum paytense (Kiener, 1834)
 Buccinastrum uruguayense (Pilsbry, 1897)

References

External links
 Pastorino, G. & Simone, L.R.L. (2021). Revision of the genus Buccinanops (Mollusca: Neogastropoda: Nassariidae), an endemic group of gastropods from the Southwestern Atlantic, including a new genus and accounts on the Buccinanopsinae classification. Journal of Zoological Systematics and Evolutionary Research. 59(6): 1209-1254

Buccinanopsidae